Mia Dillon (born July 9, 1955) is an American actress.

Early life 
Born in Colorado Springs, Colorado, Dillon graduated from Marple-Newtown Senior High School in Newtown Square, Pennsylvania.

Career 
Dillon made her Broadway debut as an understudy for the roles of Jill Mason and the Nurse in Peter Shaffer's Equus in 1977. She was nominated for the 1980 Drama Desk Award for Outstanding Featured Actress in a Play for Once a Catholic, and the 1982 Tony Award for Best Featured Actress in a Play for Crimes of the Heart. Her other theater credits include Agnes of God, The Corn is Green, Hay Fever, Come Back, Little Sheba, Three Sisters, and Our Town. In 1985 Dillon performed in a staged reading of the novel Breaker Boys at Pennsylvania's Showcase Theatre.
  
On television, Dillon was featured in Mary and Rhoda and has appeared in all three current shows in the Law & Order franchise. Her screen credits include The Money Pit, A Shock to the System, Gods and Generals, and Duane Hopwood. Dillon was also featured in the Disney Channel made-for-tv comedy film Lots of Luck, alongside Annette Funicello and Martin Mull.

Personal life 
Dillon has been married to actor Keir Dullea since 1999. They divide their time between an apartment in Manhattan and a home in Connecticut.

Filmography

Film

Television

References

External links

American stage actresses
American film actresses
American television actresses
Actresses from Colorado Springs, Colorado
1955 births
Living people
20th-century American actresses
21st-century American actresses